
Gmina Wyszków is an urban-rural gmina (administrative district) in Wyszków County, Masovian Voivodeship, in east-central Poland.

Villages
Apart from the town of Wyszków, Gmina Wyszków contains the villages and settlements of:

Neighbouring gminas
Gmina Wyszków is bordered by the gminas of Brańszczyk, Dąbrówka, Jadów, Łochów, Rząśnik, Somianka and Zabrodzie.

References

Polish official population figures 2006

Wyszkow
Wyszków County